Nung may refer to:
 Nùng people, a Tai-speaking ethnic group of Vietnam and China
 Chinese Nùng, a group of ethnic Chinese of Vietnam
 Nùng language (Tai), a Kra-Dai language of Vietnam, China and Laos
 Nung language (Sino-Tibetan), a Sino-Tibetan language of China and Myanmar
 Yue Chinese language, also called Chinese Nung
Nung/Nong, Chinese surname (農 / 农)